Annie S. Macdonald (1849-1924) was an artistic bookbinder from Scotland, active in the 1890s and the early 20th century. She was known for her study of old binding techniques, determining how book bindings were created in the medieval era and duplicating the methods used.

Biography
She was born Ann Smith Johnston in Lanark, on 20 November 1849, to Lucy Leitch and Fred Johnston. She was raised in Lanark and Glasgow, and in 1880 married William Rae Macdonald, an Edinburgh actuary. The Macdonalds' circle of friends in Edinburgh included art critic John Miller Gray and Phoebe Anna Traquair. Macdonald and Gray began "searching out and enjoying old bindings in libraries," and this pastime led to an interest in trying the art of bookbinding for themselves. Walter Biggar Blaikie, another friend of the Macdonalds, allowed Annie Macdonald to practice in the workroom of the A. & T. Constable printing firm. There, she honed her skills and worked with the Edinburgh Social Union, of which she was a member, to institute a series of bookbinding classes led by employees of the Constable firm.

Out of her practice in the Constable workroom, Annie Macdonald developed a method of embossing a leather binding which she would use throughout her career. Working on a goatskin binding that had already been attached to a book, she would dampen the leather, trace a design on to the surface, and work the design in relief using a Dresden tool. She became a leading member in a group of Edinburgh women binders (including Jessie MacGibbon, Mrs. Douglas MacLagan, Jean Pagin, and Phoebe Anna Traquair). Her medievalist bindings began to gain attention, and were selected along with others from her Edinburgh group for display in the Victorian Era Exhibition at Earl's Court in 1897. There, they attracted attention of Frank Karslake, a bookseller, who was inspired to host an exhibition of women's bookbindings at his London bookstore. Karslake offered to act as a sales agent for several women binders, including Macdonald, who was excited to have an outlet for her bindings in London. Macdonald was later loosely associated with Karslake's venture, the Guild of Women Binders, until its dissolution in 1904, although she only sold a few of her bindings through it.

Annie S. Macdonald died in Edinburgh on 21 October 1924.

References

1849 births
1924 deaths
Bookbinders
People from Lanark